Max Äberli (9 February 1927 – 2009) was a Swiss cyclist. He competed in the tandem event at the 1948 Summer Olympics.

References

External links
 

1927 births
2009 deaths
Swiss male cyclists
Olympic cyclists of Switzerland
Cyclists at the 1948 Summer Olympics
Cyclists from Zürich